The badminton women's singles tournament at the 2014 Asian Games in Incheon took place 24–28 September 2014 at Gyeyang Gymnasium.

Schedule
All times are Korea Standard Time (UTC+09:00)

Results
Legend
WO — Won by walkover

Final

Top half

Bottom half

References

External links
Official website

Badminton at the 2014 Asian Games